Inauguration of Jakaya Kikwete may refer to:

First inauguration of Jakaya Kikwete, 2005
Second inauguration of Jakaya Kikwete, 2010